Apistoloricaria condei is a species of armored catfish endemic to Ecuador where it is found in the Napo River basin. This species grows to a length of  SL.

Etymology
The catfish is named in honor of zoologist Bruno Condé(fr) (1920-2004), the director of l’Aquarium de Nancy.

References
 

Loricariini
Fish of South America
Freshwater fish of Ecuador
Taxa named by Isaäc J. H. Isbrücker
Taxa named by Han Nijssen
Fish described in 1986